Lade Manor (Norwegian: Lade gård  or Lade Gaard) is the manor house of one of the historic farms of Norway.  It is located in the community of Lade outside the city of Trondheim.

History
Lade was traditionally the seat of the Earls of Lade (ladejarler), who ruled Trøndelag and Hålogaland from the 9th century to the 11th century. During the reign of King Harald Fairhair, Lade became one of the royal residences. After the introduction of Christianity in Norway, the property was subject to use by the Bakke Abbey.  It became Crown land after the Protestant Reformation.

The present buildings were  built in the Empire style and erected in 1810-1811 at the direction of Hilmar Meincke Krohg  (1776–1851), County Governor of Romsdals Amt.

The property was purchased by the City of Trondheim in 1917. Over the years, the site housed the  Norwegian College of General Sciences  and the premises were used by Social Academy in Trondheim (Sosialhøgskolen, Trondheim).

In 1992, Reitan Group bought the property from the municipality. Under their direction, the buildings were restored. Reitan Group’s cultural and financial center currently occupies the site.

References

External links
Lade gård

Buildings and structures in Trondheim
Farms in Trøndelag
Historic farms in Norway
Manor houses in Norway
Trondheim